The following is a list of motorcycles, scooters and mopeds produced by Honda. (North American Market only)

List by engine size

Mopeds and light motorcycles
A-Type
AirBlade
Ape series
Chaly
Cub series
Cub F
CT50 Motra
CY50
Express
Grom
MB/T/X series two-stroke models
MB50/MB5
MR50
MT50/MT5
P50/P25
PA50 (Hobbit/Camino)
PC50/PS50
SFX50
SH50
SL70
ST series (Dax)
Wave series
Z series Monkey models
ZB50

Motorcycle models
Bros/HawkGT (NT650)
CB series
CBF series
CBR series
CJ series
CLR series
CM series
CR series
CRF series
CT series
CX series
Dax
Fury
GL series
NT series
ST series
Valkyrie
VF/VFR series
VT series
VTX series
XR/XL series (dirt and dual-sport bikes)

Off-road models
CRF150F
CRF250X
CRF450X
CRF450RX
CRF230F
MR250
TR200
XR80
XR100
XR250R
XR350R
XR600R
XR650R

Dual-purpose models
CRF150L
CRF230L
CRF250L/CRF300L
CRF1000L Africa Twin
CRF1100L Africa Twin
MT125
MT250
NX250
NX650 Dominator
SL90
TLR200
Transalp
XL70
XL75
XL80
XL100
XL125
XL125V Varadero
XL175
XL250
XL350
XL500
XL600LM/RMG
XR650L
XRE300
XRV650 Africa Twin
XRV750T Africa Twin

Motocross models
CR80R
CR85R Expert
CR125R
CR250R
CR500R
CRF110R
CRF150R
CRF250R
CRF450R

Scooters
Activa
Aviator
Beat (FC50)
Big Ruckus
Biz
CN250 (Helix/Fusion/Spazio)
Honda Dio
Elite
Express, Express SR
Grazia
Joker
Juno
Metropolitan/Jazz/Scoopy/Crea Scoopy
Metropolitan II
Motocompo
NH series
Eve/Spree/Nifty 50 (NQ50)
Reflex, Reflex ABS (NSS300 Forza in Europe and Canada)
PCX 125 and 150
Pop 100 and 110i
Silver Wing, Silver Wing ABS
SFX50
SH150i
Sparta
Vision/Spacy
Zoomer/Ruckus

Racing (HRC) models

CR93
MT125R
NR500
NSR500
NSR500V
RC211V
RC212V
RC213V
RCV1000R
RS125
RS125R
RS250R

All Terrain Vehicles

 1987 Honda ATC50 (prototype)
 1973-1974, 1978-1985 Honda ATC70; first mini ATV
 1970-1978 Honda ATC90 (was US90 from 1970-1973)
 1979-1985 Honda ATC110
 1984-1987 Honda ATC125M
 Honda ATC125R (prototype)
 1980 Honda ATC185
 1981-1983 Honda ATC185S
 1981-1987 Honda ATC200 series
 1981-1983 Honda ATC200
 1983-1984 Honda ATC200E Big Red
 1984 Honda ATC200ES Big Red
 1984-1985 Honda ATC200M
 1984-1986 Honda ATC200S
 1983-1987 Honda ATC200X
 1985 Honda ATC200R (prototype)
 1985-1987 Honda ATC250ES
 1981-1986 Honda ATC250R; first high-performance ATV
 1985-1987 Honda ATC250SX
 Honda ATC300R (prototype)
 Honda ATC350R (prototype)
 1985-1986 Honda ATC350X
 1987 Honda ATC500R (prototype)
 1977-1988 Honda Odyssey 250 and 350
 1989-1990 Honda Pilot 400
 1990 Honda Duet (prototype)
 1986-1987 Honda Fourtrax 70 
 1993-present Honda TRX90X 
 1985-1988 Honda Fourtrax 125 
 1984 Honda Fourtrax 200 (Honda's first four-wheel ATV)
 1990-1991 Honda Fourtrax 200 "Trunkmobile"
 1991-1997 Honda Fourtrax 200 Type II
 1986-1988 Honda Fourtrax 200SX
 1997-present Honda Recon 250
 1985-1987 Honda Fourtrax 250
 1986-1989 Honda Fourtrax 250R
 1987-1988, 1991-1992 Honda Fourtrax 250X
 2006-present Honda Sportrax 250EX/250X
 1988-2000 Honda Fourtrax 300
 1993-1999 Honda Fourtrax 300EX
 1986-1989 Honda Fourtrax 350/Foreman 350 (Honda's first four-wheel-drive ATV)
 2000-2015 Honda Rancher 350
 1999-2016 Honda Fourtrax 400EX/400X
 1995-2004 Honda Foreman 400
 2016-present Honda Rancher 420 
 1998-2004 Honda Foreman 450S/450ES
 2004-2014 Honda TRX450R
 2005-2019 Honda Foreman 500/Foreman Rubicon 500
 2020-present Honda Foreman 520/Foreman Rubicon 520
 2003-2005 Honda Rincon 650
 2006-present Honda Rincon 680
 2008-2009 Honda TRX 700XX

Side-by-Sides (SXS) 
 2008-2013 Honda Big Red 700, Honda's first Side-by-Side
 2015-present Honda Pioneer 500
 2021-present Honda Pioneer 520
 2013-present Honda Pioneer 700
 2016-present Honda Pioneer 1000
 2019-present Honda Talon 1000R
 2019-present Honda Talon 1000X

Prototypes 
 1948 B-Type
 1995 EXP-2
 2007 EVO6

References 

 
Lists of motorcycles by brand
Hydrogen motorcycles